Lov na mamuta is a 1964 Czechoslovak film. The film starred Josef Kemr.

References

External links
 

1964 films
Czechoslovak musical comedy films
1960s Czech-language films
Czech musical comedy films
1960s Czech films